The Rizen is a 2017 horror film written by Matt Mitchell and produced by Clare Pearce for Lost Eye Films, directed by Matt Mitchell for Lost Eye Films and starring Laura Swift, Sally Phillips, Tom Goodman-Hill, Adrian Edmondson, Julian Rhind-Tutt and Bruce Payne. The film was cast and produced by Clare Pearce and for a UK independent film the cast is full of well known cameos.

Plot
In 1955, NATO and the Allied Forces have been conducting secret, occult experiments in a bid to win the Arms Race. Now, they have finally succeeded but what the Army has unleashed threatens to tear our world apart. One woman must lead the only survivors past horrors that the military has no way to control - and fight to close what should never have been opened.

Cast
Laura Swift as Frances
Sally Phillips as The Suited Woman
Tom Goodman-Hill as Number 37
Bruce Payne as Admin
Julian Rhind-Tutt as Blast Door Scientist
Stephen Marcus as The Executioner
Patrick Knowles as Briggs
Lee Latchford-Evans as Capture The Flag 1
Jayson Dickens	as Capture The Flag 2
Simeon Willis as Lieutenant Franks
Adrian Edmondson as Interviewer
Christopher Tajah as Baughman
Laurence Kennedy as Dr. Julian Hicks

Production
The film was shot on-set in Kent in a huge warehouse and also in various Kent locations at Kelvedon Hatch Secret Nuclear Bunker in Kelvedon Hatch, and various town halls. Lost Eye Films managed to gain support from the local community throughout the production.

Further scenes filmed in Kent were at the Manor Way Business Park in Swanscombe which was used as a studio, supplemented by Gravesend Old Town Hall which featured as a Grand Hall, and one of the endless, dark corridors in the Powerhub in Maidstone was also used.

Reception

David Dent stated that the film 'is a very bargain basement Resident Evil ripoff (actually it’s more like the second film in the franchise)'. Simon Ball described the film as a 'fabulous piece of restrained retro Brit Sci Fi' that evoked the 'golden age of Brit Sci-fi when the government in Westminster could just throw National Servicemen at a threat whether an alien jelly monster (1955’s The Quatermass Xperiment, or X the Unknown 1957), a massive dinosaur (Gorgo, 1961) or an outrageously huge gorilla (Konga 1961)'. Mike McLelland stated that 'despite the obviously limited budget, some stiff acting, and various technical disappointments, The Rizen propels forward, maintaining interest with well-choreographed action, a suitably mysterious central plot, and a snazzy visual flair. It is fast-paced and thoroughly entertaining, even if it doesn’t completely rise to the occasion'. John Migliore stated that 'great performances and a spectacular ending make The Rizen a winner…'.

Chris Luciantonio gave the film a less favourable review, commenting that 'even upon enduring the abysmal apocalyptic indolence of The Rizen for 140 incoherent minutes of dawdling about in underground corridors littered with feral mutants(?), I am still uncertain as to where director Matt Mitchell’s head was at behind the camera or if he can even make sense of the mess he made'. Similarly, Helen Murdoch stated that the film 'is a plodding and at times awful film to watch'.
Jim McLennan lamented that the viewer has 'to endure painfully repetitive meandering through dark corridors for what seems like forever'. Sue Finn stated that 'with touches of the Cold War and '50s paranoia plus inter-dimensional portals', the film 'had the potential to be intriguing and involving, but is instead a wasted opportunity on the road to dullsville'.

References

External links
 
 

2017 films
British horror films
2010s English-language films
2010s British films